Luciano Fernando (born April 13, 1992) is a Brazilian professional baseball outfielder who is a free agent. He has played in Nippon Professional Baseball (NPB) for the Tohoku Rakuten Golden Eagles. He has also played for the Brazil national team.

In 2017, he joined the Venados de Mazatlán in Mexico, becoming the first Brazilian player in Mexican Pacific League history.

Early life
Born in Brazil, Fernando moved to Japan with his family at the age of five. He initially dreamed of being a professional footballer, but began playing baseball in Japan.

Career

Tohoku Rakuten Golden Eagles
Tohoku Rakuten Golden Eagles selected Fernando with the ? selection in the 2014 NPB draft.

On April 19, 2015, Fernando made his NPB debut.

On December 2, 2020, he become a free agent.

Saitama Musashi Heat Bears
Fernando signed with the Saitama Musashi Heat Bears for the 2021 season. He resigned for the 2022 season.

International career
Fernando represented the Brazil national team in World Baseball Classic (WBC) qualifiers in 2017 and 2023.

References

External links

NPB stats

Living people
1992 births
Brazilian emigrants to Japan
Brazilian expatriate baseball players in Mexico
National baseball team players
Nippon Professional Baseball outfielders
Sportspeople from Mato Grosso do Sul
Tohoku Rakuten Golden Eagles players
Venados de Mazatlán players